Springwood State High School is a Queensland state school located in the Logan City suburb of Springwood. The school opened in 1977 to Grade 8 students with its official opening in 1978. In addition to this, the school is home to many native animal species including Koalas, Wallabies and many species of birds.

The school is home to one of fifteen air quality monitoring stations in South East Queensland.

Former students

Some Springwood High School students have become notable, including:
 Steven Bradbury - First Australian gold medal winner at the Winter Olympics
 Jodie Henry - Triple Olympic gold medal winner
 Aidan McLindon - Queensland politician
 Grant Musgrove - Ex-Queensland politician (was member for Springwood)
 Lorna Jane Clarkson - founder of Lorna Jane fitness clothing stores worldwide
 Quade Cooper - rugby union player
 Steven Johnson - Australian V8 racing driver

See also

List of schools in Greater Brisbane

References

External links
 Springwood State High School

Public high schools in Queensland
Schools in Logan City
Educational institutions established in 1977
1977 establishments in Australia